Furr's (also known as Furr's Cafeteria, Furr's Family Dining, Furr's Fresh Buffet, and Furr's All-You-Can-Eat Marketplace) was a chain of family restaurants in the United States started by Roy Furr. The first location opened in 1946 in Hobbs, New Mexico. For many decades, Furr's was known for cafeteria-style dining, but eventually redeveloped into buffet-style dining.

History
In 1946, brothers Roy and Key Furr founded the first Furr's restaurant, opened in Hobbs in southeastern New Mexico. A second location was opened in Odessa, Texas, in 1947.

Furr's was purchased by the Kmart Corp. in 1980, and subsequently sold by Kmart to Michael Levenson's Limited National Partnership in 1988.

In 1998, its corporate history is notable for having its board of directors ousted by an institutional investor TIAA-CREF.

In 2000, the company established a new name, Furr's Restaurant Group. In December 2002, Furr's closed its two locations in Las Vegas as part of a corporate downsizing plan to close 11 under-performing restaurants across the United States by the end of the year. The company reorganized under Chapter 11 bankruptcy in January 2003. Shortly afterward, the company was sold to a private investment firm, CIC-Buffet Partners, an affiliate of Cardinal Investment Co.

In January 2014, Furr's closed several locations, including Las Cruces, New Mexico, Big Spring, Texas, Wheat Ridge, Colorado, and Wichita, Kansas. "We are closed for business," says assistant general manager Tim Arnoldussen. "It’s just a corporate decision."

In June 2014, Furr's Fresh Buffet was sold to a San Antonio company (Food Management Partners), which planned to begin opening new sites. The following year, the parent company of Furr's acquired Ovation Brands.

In April 2019, a Furr's location closed unexpectedly in Plainview, Texas. On August 26, 2019, another Furr's location did the same in Lubbock, Texas across from the South Plains Mall.

In April 2021, Furr's parent company Fresh Acquisitions LLC and Buffets LLC filed for Chapter 11 bankruptcy and all Furr's were permanently closed.

References

1946 establishments in New Mexico
2021 disestablishments in Texas
Buffet restaurants
Defunct companies based in Texas
Companies based in San Antonio
Companies that filed for Chapter 11 bankruptcy in 2003
Companies that filed for Chapter 11 bankruptcy in 2014
Companies that filed for Chapter 11 bankruptcy in 2021
Companies that have filed for Chapter 7 bankruptcy
Lea County, New Mexico
Regional restaurant chains in the United States
Restaurants established in 1946
Restaurants in New Mexico
Defunct restaurant chains in the United States
Restaurants disestablished in 2021